The following outline is provided as an overview of and topical guide to the Middle Ages:

Middle Ages – periodization of European history from the 5th century to the 15th century. The Middle Ages follows the fall of the Western Roman Empire in 476 and precedes the Early Modern Era. It is the middle period of a three-period division of Western history: Classic, Medieval and Modern.

Essence of the Middle Ages 

Middle Ages
 Timeline of the Middle Ages

Subdivisions of the Middle Ages

Periodization 
 Early Middle Ages
 High Middle Ages
 Late Middle Ages
 Crisis of the Late Middle Ages

Medieval history by region 

 Albania in the Middle Ages
 History of Bosnia and Herzegovina (958–1463)
 Visoko during the Middle Ages
 Britain in the Middle Ages
 Invasions of the British Isles
 Medieval religion in England
 Bulgarian Empire
 First Bulgarian Empire
 Second Bulgarian Empire
 Byzantine Empire
 Medieval Croatian state
 Cyprus in the Middle Ages
 History of the Czech lands in the Middle Ages
 France in the Middle Ages
 Germany in the Middle Ages
 Holy Roman Empire
 Kingdom of Hungary in the Middle Ages
 Italy in the Middle Ages
 Poland in the Middle Ages
 Romania in the Middle Ages
 Scotland in the Middle Ages
 Scotland in the Early Middle Ages
 Scotland in the High Middle Ages
 Culture of Scotland in the High Middle Ages
 Economy of Scotland in the High Middle Ages
 Legal institutions of Scotland in the High Middle Ages
 Society of Scotland in the High Middle Ages
 Warfare of Scotland in the High Middle Ages
 Scotland in the Late Middle Ages
 History of Medieval Serbia
 Sarajevo during the Middle Ages
 Spain in the Middle Ages
 Medieval Thessalonica
 Thessaly in the Middle Ages
 Wales in the Middle Ages
 Wales in the Early Middle Ages
 Wales in the High Middle Ages
 Wales in the Late Middle Ages

Medieval history by subject 

 Agriculture in the Middle Ages
 Allegory in the Middle Ages
 Medieval archaeology
   Medieval armies
 Byzantine army
 Medieval Bulgarian army
 Great Heathen Army
 Komnenian army
 Moldavian military forces
 Sassanid army
 Medieval art
 Medieval dance
 Medieval music
 Medieval poetry
 Medieval theatre
 Medieval architecture
 Castle
 Medieval churches of York
 Medieval fortification
 Medieval Christianity
 Medieval climate
 Medieval Warm Period
 Medieval communes
 Medieval chronological timeline
 Crisis of the Late Middle Ages
 Crusades
 Medieval cuisine
 Medieval culture
 Byzantine silk
 Market town
 Medieval demography
 Medieval education
 Medieval university
 Medieval etymology
 Medieval gardening
 Medieval guilds
 Horses in the Middle Ages
 Medieval household
 Medieval hunting
 Medieval Inquisition
 History of the Jews in the Middle Ages
 Medieval languages
 Middle English
 Medieval Greek
 Medieval Hebrew
 Old Church Slavonic
 Old Irish language
 Middle Irish language
 Medieval Latin
 Middle Welsh language
 Medieval literature
 Medieval Bulgarian literature
 Medieval Dutch literature
 Medieval French literature
 Medieval German literature
 Early Irish literature
 Medieval numeral
 Medieval poetry
 Romance (heroic literature)
 Medieval Welsh literature
 Medieval maritime culture
 Medieval medicine of Western Europe
 Black Death
 Medieval money
 Bezant
 Medieval philosophy
 Medieval religion
 Allegory in the Middle Ages
 Christian monasticism
 Medieval churches of York
 Medieval Roman Catholic Missions in China
 Medieval science
 Alchemy
 Slave trade in the Middle Ages
 Medieval sport
 Medieval football
 Medieval tournament
 Medieval superstition
 Medieval revenant
 Medieval witchcraft
 Medieval technology
 Medieval warfare
 Byzantine battle tactics
 Castle
 Crusades
 Medieval fortification
 Siege engine
 Warfare of Scotland in the High Middle Ages
 Medieval wonders
 Seven wonders of the Middle Ages

History of medieval history 

Middle Ages in history
 The Autumn of the Middle Ages
 Dictionary of the Middle Ages
 English historians in the Middle Ages
 Medieval archaeology
 Medievalism
 Medievalist
 Medieval fantasy
 Medieval popular Bible
 Medieval reenactment
 Middle Ages in film
 Neo-medievalism
 Medieval food
 :Category:Medieval law

Medieval history scholars 

Medievalist
 Umberto Eco
 David Herlihy

Medieval historical societies 
 Medieval Academy of America
 Medieval Chronicle Society
 Medieval Combat Society
 Medieval Scenarios and Recreations
 The Medieval Siege Society

Medieval themed festivals and recreational events 
 Medieval Market of Turku
 Medieval reenactment
 Medieval Times

Leaders during the Middle Ages 
 Charlemagne
 List of English monarchs
 List of Frankish kings
 Holy Roman Emperor

Related lists 

Medieval chronological timeline
 List of medieval abbreviations
 List of medieval land terms
 List of medieval weapons

See also 

 Cultural movement
 Logarithmic timeline
 History by period
 History of Europe
 List of time periods
 Periodization

External links 

Internet Medieval Sourcebook Project Primary source archive of the Middle Ages.
The Online Reference Book of Medieval Studies Academic peer reviewed articles.
Medieval Knights Medieval Knights is a medieval educational resource site geared to students and medieval enthusiasts.
The Labyrinth Resources for Medieval Studies.
NetSERF The Internet Connection for Medieval Resources.
The Middle Ages - an informational site for teachers and students
Medieval Realms Learning resources from the British Library including studies of beautiful medieval manuscripts
Information of the Medieval Period.
De Re Militari: The Society for Medieval Military History

Medieval history
Medieval history
Outline
History-related lists
Middle Ages-related lists